Russell H. "Russ" Armstrong (born May 3, 1962 in Evanston, Illinois) is an American curler.

At the international level, he is a  bronze medallist.

At the national level, he is a 1985 United States men's curling champion curler and two-time United States senior curler champion (2014, 2018).

Teams

Men's

Mixed

References

External links

Living people
American male curlers
American curling champions
1962 births
Sportspeople from Evanston, Illinois